Donald Francis Tricker  is a former player and coach of the New Zealand national softball team (Black Sox) and senior advisor of high performance coaching at the New Zealand Academy of Sport.

Family background
Tricker's grandfather was one of the country's leading softball umpires and played a key role in introducing the game to the Wellington region.

Sporting career

Player
Tricker played softball for Porirua until he was 22 then moved to Poneke Kilbirnie, claiming regional and national titles with both clubs, and played for the Black Sox on and off between 1986 and 1991.

Coach
Tricker began his softball coaching career at Poneke Kilbirnie in 1996, while he was still playing, and was named Black Sock coach two years later. He coached the team to two world championship wins in 2000 and three consecutive world titles. He retired as national coach in 2004, being replaced by Eddie Kohlhase. 

In 2002, after six years in the information technology sector, Tricker was appointed as senior advisor of high performance coaching at the New Zealand Academy of Sport, a unit of Sport and Recreation New Zealand.  Tricker and Auckland lawyer Mike Heron prepared a report into the All Blacks early World Cup exit. In 2010 the New Zealand Rugby Union has appointed Tricker as the High Performance Manager.

Honours and awards
Tricker was named coach of the year at the 2000 Halberg Awards, after leading the team to a world series victory in South Africa In the 2004 Queen's Birthday Honours, he was appointed an Officer of the New Zealand Order of Merit, for services to softball.

References

Living people
Year of birth missing (living people)
Sportspeople from Porirua
New Zealand softball players
New Zealand softball coaches
Officers of the New Zealand Order of Merit